Viscount Mackintosh of Halifax, of Hethersett in the County of Norfolk, is a title in the Peerage of the United Kingdom. It was created on 10 July 1957 for the businessman and public servant Harold Mackintosh, 1st Baron Mackintosh of Halifax. He was the owner of the confectionery business of John Mackintosh & Sons Ltd and for many years Chairman of the National Savings Committee. Mackintosh had already been created a baronet, of Halifax in the West Riding of the County of York, in the Baronetage of the United Kingdom on 28 January 1935, and Baron Mackintosh of Halifax, of Hethersett in the County of Norfolk, on 6 February 1948, also in the Peerage of the United Kingdom.  the titles are held by his grandson, the third Viscount, who succeeded his father in 1980.

Viscounts Mackintosh of Halifax (1957)
Harold Vincent Mackintosh, 1st Viscount Mackintosh of Halifax (1891–1964)
John Mackintosh, 2nd Viscount Mackintosh of Halifax (1921–1980)
John Clive Mackintosh, 3rd Viscount Mackintosh of Halifax (b. 1958)

The heir apparent is the present holder's son, Hon. Thomas Harold George Mackintosh (b. 1985)
The heir apparent’s heir apparent is his son, Milo Edward Mackintosh (b.2020)

Line of Succession

  Harold Vincent Mackintosh, 1st Viscount Mackintosh of Halifax (1891 – 1964)
  John Mackintosh, 2nd Viscount Mackintosh of Halifax (1921 – 1980)
  John Clive Mackintosh, 3rd Viscount Mackintosh of Halifax (b. 1958)
 (1) Hon. Thomas Harold George Mackintosh (b. 1985)
 (2) Milo Edward Mackintosh (b. 2020)
 (3) Hon. George John Frank Mackintosh (b. 1988)
 (4) Hon. Graham Charles Mackintosh (b. 1964)
 (5) Matthew Joseph Mackintosh (b. 1997)
 (6) John Ashford Mackintosh (b. 2000)
 (7) Robert Charles Mackintosh (b. 2004)

References

Kidd, Charles, Williamson, David (editors). Debrett's Peerage and Baronetage (1990 edition). New York: St Martin's Press, 1990.

Viscountcies in the Peerage of the United Kingdom
Noble titles created in 1957